Society 1 is an American industrial metal band formed in the 1990s in Los Angeles by lead singer Matt Zane. They have released four studio albums, a live album, a compilation album, and a spoken word poetry album by vocalist Zane. The band has also performed at several major festivals, including Download, where Zane broke several records by performing the entire set suspended from four meat hooks through his back. Zane has performed while suspended on several other occasions.

Discography

Studio albums
Slacker Jesus (InZane Records, 1999)
Words as Carriers (InZane Records, 2002)
Exit Through Fear  (Earache Records, 2003)
The Sound that Ends Creation (Earache Records, 2005)
The Years of Spiritual Dissent (Crash Music, 2006)
A Journey from Exile (2011)
A Collection of Lies (Independent 2014)
Rise from the Dead (DSN Music, 2017)

Live albums
Live and Raw (InZane Records, 2008)

DVD videos
Fearing the Exit (Earache Records, 2004)
The Creation of Sound – packaged with 'The Sound That Ends Creation' (Earache Records, 2004)
In Our Own Images – packaged with 'The Years of Spiritual Dissent' (Crash Music, 2006)

Music videos
"Nothing" – from Exit Through Fear
"Hate" – from Exit Through Fear
"All You Want" – from Exit Through Fear
"It Isn't Me – from The Sound that Ends Creation
"This Is The End" – from The Years of Spiritual Dissent
"Scream Out Your Breath" – from A Journey from Exile
"I Got You" – from A Journey from Exile
"It's Yours Now" – from Rise from the Dead
"I Can't Feel" – from Rise from the Dead
"Can't Unsee" – lockdown challenge track created during the 2020 coronavirus pandemic
"I Reach Through" – second lockdown challenge track created during the 2020 coronavirus pandemic
"Sunglasses at Night" – the first music video to be filmed entirely on selfie sticks, created during the 2020 coronavirus pandemic lockdown
"The Soul Searches" – acoustic

Members
Current
 Matt "The Lord" Zane – vocals, programming, guitar
 Jimmy Minj – bass
 Johnny Pilz – guitar
 Zhenya Pro – drums

Former
 Dirt Von Karloff – bass, backing vocals (d. 2021)
 Maxxxwell Carlisle – guitar
 Iorden Mitev – drums
 Preston Nash - drums
 Devin Norris – guitar (1997–2001)
 Justin Reynolds – bass, backing vocals (1997–2001)
 James Adrian Cross – drums (1997–2001)
 Sin Quirin – keyboards (2000–2001), guitars (2001–2006)
 Ivan DePrume – drums (2001–2002)
 Dagon – drums (2002–2003)
 Aleister – bass (2003–2004)
 Adrian Ost – touring drummer (2003–2004)
 Paul Raven – bass on Exit Through Fear (2003) (d. 2007)
 Berzerk Kirk – drums (2005–2006)
 Sik Rick – drums (????–2010)
 Eric Franklin – guitar (2006–2010)
 Brian Jackson – guitar (2012–2013) 
 Brett Pirozzi – bass (2012)
 Alex Crescioni – guitar (2015–2016)

References

External links
 

Earache Records artists
Heavy metal musical groups from California
American industrial metal musical groups
Musical groups from Los Angeles
Musical quartets
Musical groups established in 1999
1999 establishments in California